Bernard Newman (August 4, 1914 – November 6, 1995) was a politician in Ontario, Canada. He was a Liberal member of the Legislative Assembly of Ontario from 1959 to 1987 who represented the riding of Windsor—Walkerville.

Background
Newman was born in Windsor, Ontario. He received a Bachelor of Arts degree from Assumption College at the University of Windsor, and began working as a secondary school teacher in 1934. He also reached the rank of Lieutenant in the Canadian Armed Forces. A star athlete in high school, Newman served as national chairman of gymnastics for the Amateur Athletic Union of Canada in 1955-56, and coached the Canadian gymnastic team at the 1956 Olympic Games, the 1958 World Games and the 1959 Pan-American Games. Newman died in 1995, after being diagnosed as suffering from Alzheimer's disease.

Politics
Newman was elected as a Windsor alderman in 1954, and served three terms on the city council from 1955 to 1960.

In the 1959 provincial election he ran as the Liberal candidate in the riding of Windsor—Walkerville. He defeated Progressive Conservative Roy Hicks by 1,073 votes.  He was re-elected seven more times before retiring from the legislature in 1987 after 28 years of service.

From 1959 to 1985, he sat in opposition. Following the 1985 election, the Liberal Party ended forty-two years of Progressive Conservative government in Ontario by forming a minority administration with outside support from the NDP. He served as a backbench supporter of the David Peterson government.  He did not seek re-election in 1987.

References

External links
 
 Tribute in Legislative Assembly of Ontario, November 15, 1995
 University of Windsor Alumni Sports Hall of Fame biography

1914 births
1995 deaths
Gymnastics coaches
Ontario Liberal Party MPPs
Politicians from Windsor, Ontario
University of Windsor alumni